NBKC Bank (stylized nbkc bank) is a United States-based bank headquartered in Overland Park. It was established in 1999 as Horizon National Bank, changing its name to National Bank of Kansas City in 2004 before rebranding as nbkc bank in 2015. The bank is owned by Ameri-National Corporation.

For 2020, NBKC Bank had 424 employees and $150 million in net income. They originated over 20,000 mortgages with a value of $7.1 billion.

References

External links
 Official website

1999 establishments in Missouri
Companies based in Overland Park, Kansas
Banks based in Kansas